Fig Tree Bay is a sandy beach in Protaras of Paralimni in Cyprus. In 2011, TripAdvisor declared it to be the third best beach in Europe, though it dropped to 13th place in 2013.

Overview
As with all beaches in Cyprus, access to the public is free, whilst the hiring of sunbeds and umbrellas is chargeable. A municipal car park provides parking within a short walk. The beach stretches for 500 metres, and the waters are clean enough for the beach to have been awarded blue flag designation. The beach takes its name from the fig trees located close to the coast.

There is an uninhabited islet easily reached by swimming through the shallow waters, the location of which provides a good shelter for the rest of the beach. The islet is covered with low-level local vegetation. In contrast to other local beaches, such as nearby Nissi, Fig Tree Bay has become a popular destination for families. Water sports such as water-skiing, windsurfing, and parasailing are available. From April to October, lifeguards and lifesaving equipment are available on the beach from 9am to 6pm.

In 2010, during structural improvements to the beach, an ancient Greek tomb was unearthed.

In popular culture
The song "Fig Tree Bay" from English musician Peter Frampton's 1972 album Wind of Change is about the beach.

References

Beaches of Cyprus